A district ("arrow"), is a second level administrative subdivision of Mongolia. The 21 Provinces of Mongolia are divided into 331 districts.

Its total revenue is 120 million Tögrög, 90% of which comes from national subsidies.

Each district is again subdivided into bags (brigades; sometimes spelled baghs). Most bags are of an entirely virtual nature. Their purpose is to sort the families of nomads in the district into groups, without a permanent human settlement.

Officially, and occasionally on maps, many district seats (sum centers) bear a name different from that of the district. However, in practice the district seat (sum center) is most often referred to under the name of the district, to the point of the official name of the district seat (sum center) being unknown even to the locals.

Arkhangai Province

19 districts

Battsengel
Bulgan
Chuluut
Erdenebulgan
Erdenemandal
Ikh-Tamir
Jargalant
Khangai
Khashaat
Khairkhan
Khotont
Ögii nuur
Ölziit
Öndör-Ulaan
Tariat
Tsakhir
Tsenkher
Tsetserleg
Tüvshrüülekh

Bayan-Ölgii Province

14 districts

Altantsögts
Altai
Bayannuur
Bugat
Bulgan
Buyant
Delüün
Nogoonnuur
Ölgii
Sagsai
Tolbo
Tsagaannuur
Tsengel
Ulaankhus

Bayankhongor Province

20 districts

 Baatsagaan
 Bayan-Öndör
 Bayan-Ovoo
 Bayanbulag
 Bayangovi
 Bayankhongor
 Bayanlig
 Bayantsagaan
 Bogd
 Bömbögör
 Buutsagaan
 Erdenetsogt
 Galuut
 Gurvanbulag
 Jargalant
 Jinst
 Khüreemaral
 Ölziit
 Shinejinst
 Zag

Bulgan Province

16 districts

Bayan-Agt
Bayanuur
Bugat
Bulgan
Büregkhangai
Dashinchilen
Gurvanbulag
Khangal
Khishig-Öndör
Khutag-Öndör
Mogod
Orkhon
Rashaant
Saikhan
Selenge
Teshig

Darkhan-Uul Province

4 districts
Darkhan
Khongor
Orkhon
Sharyngol

Dornod Province

14 districts

Bayan-Uul
Bayandun
Bayantümen
Bulgan
Choibalsan (sum)
Chulunkhoroot
Dashbalbar
Gurvanzagal
Khalkhgol
Kherlen
Khölönbuir
Matad
Sergelen
Tsagaan-Ovoo

Dornogovi Province

14 districts

Altanshiree
Airag
Dalanjargalan
Delgerekh
Erdene
Khatanbulag
Khövsgöl
Ikhkhet
Mandakh
Örgön
Saikhandulaan
Sainshand
Ulaanbadrakh
Zamyn-Üüd

Dundgovi Province

15 districts

Adaatsag
Bayanjargalan
Delgerkhangai
Delgertsogt
Deren
Erdenedalai
Govi-Ugtaal
Gurvansaikhan
Khuld
Luus
Ölziit
Öndörshil
Saikhan-Ovoo
Saintsagaan
Tsagaandelger

Govi-Altai Province

18 district

Altai
Bayan-Uul
Biger
Bugat
Chandmani
Darvi
Delger
Erdene
Khaliun
Khökh morit
Jargalan
Sharga
Taishir
Tögrög
Tonkhil
Tseel
Tsogt
Yesönbulag

Govisümber Province

3 districts
Bayantal
Shiveegovi
Sümber (Choir)

Khentii Province

17 district

Batnorov
Batshireet
Bayan-Adarga
Bayankhutag
Bayanmönkh
Bayan-Ovoo
Binder
Dadal
Darkhan
Delgerkhaan
Galshar
Kherlen
Jargaltkhaan
Mörön
Norovlin
Ömöndelger
Tsenkhermandal

Khovd Province

17 districts

Altai
Bulgan
Buyant
Chandmani
Darvi
Dörgön
Duut
Erdenebüren
Jargalant (Khovd city)
Khovd (sum)
Mankhan
Mönkhkhairkhan
Möst
Myangad
Tsetseg
Üyench
Zereg

Khövsgöl Province

23 districts

Alag-Erdene
Arbulag
Bayanzürkh
Bürentogtokh
Chandmani-Öndör
Erdenebulgan
Galt
Khankh
Ikh-Uul
Jargalant
Mörön
Rashaant
Renchinlkhümbe
Shine-Ider
Tarialan
Tömörbulag
Tosontsengel
Tsagaan-Uul
Tsagaannuur
Tsagaan-Üür
Tsetserleg
Tünel
Ulaan-Uul

Ömnögovi Province

15 districts

Bayan-Ovoo
Bayandalai
Bulgan
Dalanzadgad
Gurvan tes
Khanbogd
Khan khongor
Khürmen
Mandal-Ovoo
Manlai
Nomgon
Noyon
Sevrei
Tsogt-Ovoo
Tsogttsetsii

Orkhon Province

2 districts
Bayan-Öndör
Jargalant

Övörkhangai Province

19 districts

Arvaikheer
Baruun Bayan-Ulaan
Bat-Ölzii
Bayan-Öndör
Bayangol
Bogd
Bürd
Guchin-Us
Kharkhorin
Khairkhandulaan
Khujirt
Nariinteel
Ölziit
Sant
Taragt
Tögrög
Uyanga
Yesönzüil
Züünbayan-Ulaan

Selenge Province

17 districts

Altanbulag
Baruunbüren
Bayangol
Javkhlant
Khüder
Khushaat
Mandal
Orkhon
Orkhontuul
Sant
Saikhan
Shaamar
Sükhbaatar
Tsagaannuur
Tüshig
Yeröö
Züünbüren

Sükhbaatar Province

13 districts

Asgat
Baruun-Urt
Bayandelger
Dariganga
Erdenetsagaan
Khalzan
Mönkhkhaan
Naran
Ongon
Sükhbaatar
Tüvshinshiree
Tümentsogt
Uulbayan

Töv Province

27 districts

Altanbulag
Argalant
Arkhust
Batsümber
Bayan
Bayan-Önjüül
Bayanchandmani
Bayandelger
Bayanjargalan
Bayankhangai
Bayantsagaan
Bayantsogt
Bornuur
Büren
Delgerkhaan
Erdene
Erdenesant
Jargalant
Lün
Möngönmort
Öndörshireet
Sergelen
Sümber
Tseel
Ugtaal
Zaamar
Zuunmod

Uvs Province

19 districts

Baruunturuun
Bökhmörön
Davst
Khovd
Khyargas
Malchin
Naranbulag
Ölgii
Ömnögovi
Öndörkhangai
Sagil
Tarialan
Tes
Tsagaankhairkhan
Türgen
Ulaangom
Zavkhan
Züüngovi
Züünkhangai

Zavkhan Province

24 districts

Aldarkhaan
Asgat
Bayankhairkhan
Bayantes
Dörvöljin
Erdenekhairkhan
Ider
Ikh-Uul
Nömrög
Otgon
Santmargats
Shilüüstei
Songino
Telmen
Tes
Tosontsengel
Tsagaanchuluut
Tsagaankhairkhan
Tsetsen-Uul
Tüdevtei
Uliastai
Urgamal
Yaruu
Zavkhanmandal

References and external links

All Mongolian sums population 2009.12.31

 
Subdivisions of Mongolia
Mongolia, Districts
Mongolia 2
Districts, Mongolia
Mongolia geography-related lists